Manthan, also released under the translated title The Churning, is a 1976 Hindi film directed by Shyam Benegal, inspired by the pioneering milk cooperative movement of Verghese Kurien, and is written jointly by him and Vijay Tendulkar. It is set amidst the backdrop of the White Revolution of India. Aside from the great measurable success that this project was, it also demonstrated the power of "collective might" as it was entirely crowdfunded by 500,000 farmers who donated Rs. 2 each. Manthan is the first crowdfunded Indian film.

The film won the 1977 National Film Award for Best Feature Film in Hindi and National Film Award for Best Screenplay for Vijay Tendulkar, and was also India's submission for the Academy Award for Best Foreign Language Film for 1976.

The title song ("Mero Gaam Katha Parey") was sung by Preeti Sagar. She won the Filmfare Award for Best Female Playback Singer for that year. The song was later used as the soundtrack for the television commercial for Amul.

Overview

The word manthan literally means "churning", and other meanings may be deep contemplation, churning of facts, analysis aimed at a solution or conclusion. The film traces a small set of poor farmers of Kheda district in Gujarat who had the vision and foresight to act in a way that was good for the society and not for the self alone. Under leaders like local social worker Tribhovandas Patel, who took up the cause of the farmers, lead to the formation of Kaira District Co-operative Milk Producers' Union. Soon the pattern was repeated in each district of Gujarat, which in turn led to the formation of Amul, a dairy cooperative in Anand, Gujarat in 1946, which is today, jointly owned by some 2.6 million milk producers in Gujarat, India.

Eventually, this led to the initiation of White Revolution of India in 1970, by creating a "Nationwide Milk Grid", and the setting up of Gujarat Co-operative Milk Marketing Federation Ltd. (GCMMF) in 1973, whose 500,000 members jointly financed the film, by donating Rs. 2 each. Upon its release, truckloads of farmers came to see "their" film, thus making it a box office success.

Plot
The film traces the origins of the movement through its fictionalised narrative, based around rural empowerment, when a young veterinary surgeon, played by Girish Karnad, a character based on the then National Dairy Development Board (NDDB) chief, the 33-year-old Verghese Kurien, who joined hands with local social worker, Tribhovandas Patel, which led to the setting up of a local milk cooperative, in Anand, Gujarat.

Dr. Rao (Girish Karnad), a young veterinary doctor with his team of Deshmukh (Mohan Agashe), Chandravarkar (Anant Nag) and others comes to a village in Kheda district, Gujarat. The village is inhabited by poor people whose chief occupation seems to be cattle-rearing and producing milk, which they sell to a local dairy owner Mishra (Amrish Puri). Mishra pays them ridiculously low amounts for their milk. Dr. Rao and his team have arrived with the purpose of setting up a co-operative society dairy which will be owned collectively and managed by the villagers themselves. As Dr. Rao and his team grapple with village politics, rigid casteism and general distrust of the village folk, they face planned hostility from the local Harijan community's leader Bhola (Naseeruddin Shah) who harbours deep anger and resentment against the higher caste Panchayat Head (Kulbhushan Kharbanda). Local village women are led by a feisty young woman Bindu (Smita Patil), mother of a young child whose husband has supposedly left her.

Dr. Rao wins the trust of Bindu and other villagers by testing their milk and paying them fair amounts for their high fat-content milk and this irks Mishra. Deshmukh is worried by the caste politics and divide between the higher castes and Harijans in the village and repeatedly warns Rao against getting involved in it. Chandravarkar gets attracted to a local Harijan girl and has a rendezvous with her in secret. The Harijans don't want to join the co-operative as they feel that the higher caste Panch and his cronies will usurp the society as well. Rao and his associates talk sense into them and organise an election for the post of the head of the co-operative. Bhola begins to trust and believe in Rao's ideals when Rao fires Chandravarkar for cheating the Harijan girl on pretext of marrying her and bails Bhola out of jail when Panch gets him arrested for rowdy behaviour.

Meanwhile, a mutual admiration and liking develops between Rao and Bindu, which is cut short when Bindu's husband returns home suddenly and Rao's wife comes to visit him in the village. In the election, the Harijan representative bhola defeats the Panch in a tiebreaker and the Harijans erupt in joy. The Panch takes the loss terribly on his ego and joins Mishra Ji, also aided by Bindu's husband. Together, they force Bindu to put her thumb impression on legal papers that claim Dr. Rao has raped her. Dr. Rao is extremely agitated when the allegations are brought against him and starts to wonder if he has bitten off more than he can chew. His wife also falls sick with Typhoid. Dr. Rao finishes the setting up of the board and leaves with his wife. This greatly troubles Bhola as he considers this cowardice on Dr. Rao's part. Bhola, however, continues to carry on the work of the co-operative with support from a few villagers and notably, Bindu. Both of them have been inspired and churned as new, brave individuals by the work of Dr. Rao.

Cast
 Girish Karnad as Dr. Rao
 Kulbhushan Kharbanda as Sarpanch
 Smita Patil as Bindu
 Naseeruddin Shah as Bhola
 Mohan Agashe as Deshmukh
 Anant Nag as Chandavarkar
 Amrish Puri as Mishraji
 Rajendra Jaspal as Bindu's Husband
 Abha Dhulia as Shanta, Dr Rao's Wife
 Sadhu Meher as Mahapatra 
 Anjali Paigankar

Soundtrack

Awards and nominations

|-
| rowspan="2"|1976
| Amul
| National Film Award for Best Feature Film in Hindi
| 
|-
| Vijay Tendulkar
| National Film Award for Best Screenplay
| 
|-
| 1977
| Shyam Benegal
| Indian film for Academy Award for Best Foreign Language Film
| 
|-
| 1978
| Preeti Sagar (for song Mero Gaam Katha Parey)
| Filmfare Award for Best Female Playback Singer
| 
|}

Further reading
 Shyam Benegal's the Churning (Manthan): Screenplay, by, Vijay Tendulkar, Shyam Benegal, Samik Banerjee. Seagull Books, 1984. .

References

External links

 

1976 films
1970s Hindi-language films
Films directed by Shyam Benegal
Films set in Gujarat
Crowdfunded films
Films with screenplays by Vijay Tendulkar
Films whose writer won the Best Original Screenplay National Film Award